Palaiokerasia a Greek village on Mount Othrys, Echinaioi municipal unit, Phthiotis, with vast olive groves. Population 291 (2011).

References

External links
Primary School
Afternoon relaxation
Palio Xwrio Palaiokerasias
Municipality of Echineon

Populated places in Phthiotis